Vähämaa is a Finnish surname. Notable people with the surname include:

 Jaakko Vähämaa (born 1993), Finnish squash player
 Jenni Vähämaa (born 1992), Finnish figure skater

Finnish-language surnames